Randi Karlstrøm (born 25 June 1960 in Tinn) is a Norwegian politician for the Christian Democratic Party.

She was elected to the Norwegian Parliament from Finnmark in 1997, but was not re-elected in 2001.

Karlstrøm was a member of Alta municipality council from 1987 to 1991, and of Finnmark county council for two months in 1991.

References

1960 births
Living people
Christian Democratic Party (Norway) politicians
Women members of the Storting
Members of the Storting
21st-century Norwegian politicians
21st-century Norwegian women politicians
20th-century Norwegian politicians
20th-century Norwegian women politicians
People from Tinn